There is currently no official coat of arms for the Federation of Bosnia and Herzegovina. The federation is part of the state of Bosnia and Herzegovina.

The Government of the Federation of Bosnia and Herzegovina uses a seal for official purposes. The seal is circular and contains the words "Bosna i Hercegovina - Federacija Bosne i Hercegovine" in an outer ring and the words "VLADA" and "Sarajevo" in an inner ring. There is no insignia or emblem at the centre of the seal.

Former coat of arms

The federation did have its own coat of arms between 1996 and 2007 when the flag and coat of arms of the Federation of Bosnia and Herzegovina were abolished by a decision made by the Constitutional Court of Bosnia and Herzegovina. The federation has not yet adopted a new flag or coat of arms, instead the symbols of the central state are used for official purposes as a provisional solution.

The green background and the golden fleur-de-lis represented the Bosniaks, while the chequy shield represented the Bosnian Croats. The ten stars arranged in a circle represented the 10 cantons of the Federation and there is a great resemblance to twelve-starred flag of Europe.

See also

Coat of arms of Bosnia and Herzegovina
Flag of Bosnia and Herzegovina
Flag of the Federation of Bosnia and Herzegovina
Seal of Republika Srpska

References

 
Coat of arms of the Federation of Bosnia and Herzegovina
Bosnia and Herzegovina Federation
Bosnia and Herzegovina Federation